Ridwan Hirsi Mohamed is a Somali politician. He is the former Minister of Religious Affairs and former deputy Prime-minister of Somalia. He hails from the Rer Ainanshe sub-division of the Habr Yunis Garhajis clan.

Vice President of Somalia

Appointment
On 17 January 2014, Mohamed was appointed to the newly formed post of Minister of Religious Affairs by. Mohamed was also concurrently named Vice President of Somalia. He succeeded Fowsiyo Yusuf Haji Adan in the latter position.

Hussein national funeral committee
On 1 February 2014, Mohamed was appointed chair of a governmental committee tasked with organizing a national funeral for the late Prime Minister of Somalia, Abdirizak Haji Hussein, who had died on 31 January 2014.

Illicit weapons bill
In August 2014, Mohamed chaired a Cabinet meeting during which the federal ministers discussed a bill aimed at outlawing the trade and possession of illegal weapons in Somalia. The proposed legislation was part of a larger security sector reform. Cabinet ministers unanimously passed the new law, which is now slated to be brought before parliament for deliberation.

Ministry of Culture and Higher Education office
In September 2014, the Somali federal government reopened the Ministry of Culture and Higher Education building at an official ceremony in Mogadishu. The event was chaired by Deputy Prime Minister and Minister for Religious Affairs Mohamed, and was attended by representatives from various universities, parliamentarians, diplomats, educators, parents, and patriotic singers. Minister of Culture and Higher Education Duale Adan Mohamed outlined therein his ministry's efforts at rehabilitating the compound, which had been non-operational for over twenty years. Additionally, Mohamed described the reopening of the office as a major accomplishment for the government and wider society, and thanked Duale's ministry for its renovation work.

Population census
In September 2014, the Ministry of Planning and International Cooperation published a preliminary population census for Somalia. It is the first such governmental initiative in over two decades. The UNFPA assisted the Ministry in the project, which is slated to be finalized ahead of the planned plebiscite and local and national elections in 2016. According to Vice President of Somalia Ridwan Hirsi Mohamed and Minister of Planning Said Abdullahi Mohamed, the census will facilitate the implementation of Vision 2016 and general development projects in the country. The Ministry of Planning also indicated that the preliminary census data suggests that there are around 12,360,000 residents in the nation, and that it plans to conduct a census of Somalian expatriates.

References

Living people
Government ministers of Somalia
Year of birth missing (living people)